Brian Barnett may refer to:

Bryan Barnett
Brian Barnett Duff
M. Brian Barnett